The 1912 Louisiana gubernatorial election was held on April 16, 1912.  Like most Southern states between Reconstruction and the civil rights era, Louisiana's Republican Party had almost no electoral support.   This meant that the Democratic Party primary held on January 23 was the real contest over who would be governor.  The election resulted in the election of Democrat Luther E. Hall as governor of Louisiana.

Results  
Democratic Party Primary, January 23

Runoff not held due to Michel withdrawing

Republican Party Primary, January 23

General Election, April 16

References

1912
Louisiana
Gubernatorial
April 1912 events